A rube is a country bumpkin or an inexperienced, unsophisticated person.

Rube is also sometimes used as a nickname, for Reuben, Ruben or Rubin.

Arts and entertainment
Rube Bloom (1902-1976), Jewish American songwriter, pianist, arranger, band leader, vocalist and writer
Rube Goldberg (1883-1970), American cartoonist, sculptor, author, engineer, and inventor
Rubin Lacey (1902-1969), American country blues musician, singer and songwriter

Sports

Baseball
Rube Benton (1890-1937), American Major League Baseball pitcher
Rube Bressler (1894-1966), American Major League Baseball pitcher
Rube Currie (1898-1966), American baseball pitcher and manager in the Negro leagues
Rube DeGroff (1879-1955), American Major League Baseball player
George "Rube" Deneau (c. 1879-1926), Canadian minor league baseball player, manager and promoter
Rube Dessau (1883-1952), American Major League Baseball pitcher
Rube Ehrhardt (1894-1980), American Major League Baseball pitcher
Rube Ellis (1885-1938), American Major League Baseball player
Rube Fischer (1916-1997), American Major League Baseball pitcher
Rube Foster (1879–1930), American baseball player, manager, and pioneer executive in the Negro leagues, member of the Baseball Hall of Fame
Rube Foster (AL pitcher) (1888-1976), American Major League Baseball player
Rube Geyer (1884-1962), American Major League Baseball pitcher
Rube Kisinger (1876-1941), American Major League Baseball pitcher
Rube Kroh (1886-1944), American Major League Baseball pitcher
Rube Lutzke (1897-1938), American Major League Baseball player
Rube Manning (1883-1930), American Major League Baseball pitcher
Rube Marquard (1886-1980), American Major League Baseball pitcher, member of the Baseball Hall of Fame
Rube Marshall (1890-1980), American Major League Baseball pitcher
Rube Melton (1917-1971), American Major League Baseball pitcher
Rube Novotney (1924-1987), American Major League Baseball player in 1949
Rube Oldring (1884-1961), American Major League Baseball player
Rube Parnham (1894-1963), American Major League Baseball pitcher
Rube Peters (1885-1965), American Major League Baseball pitcher
Rube Schauer (1891-1957), Major League Baseball pitcher
Rube Sellers (1881-1952), American Major League Baseball player in 1910
Rube Vickers (1878-1958), American Major League Baseball pitcher
Rube Vinson (1879-1951), American Major League Baseball player
Rube Waddell (1876-1914), American Major League Baseball pitcher
Rube Walberg (1896-1978), American Major League Baseball pitcher
Rube Walker (1926-1992), American Major League Baseball catcher and pitching coach
Rube Ward (1879-1945), American Major League Baseball player in 1902
Rube Yarrison (1896-1977), American Major League Baseball pitcher

Other
Rube Barker (1889-1958), American college football player and track athlete in the 1910s
Rube Bjorkman (born 1929), former collegiate ice hockey head coach
Rube Brandow (1898–1932), Canadian professional ice hockey player and college coach
Rube Ferns (1873-1952), American boxer, world welterweight champion in 1900 and 1901
Rube Lautenschlager (1915–1992), American college and professional basketball player
Rube Ludwig (c. 1920-1991), Canadian football player
Rube McCray (1904-1972), head football, men's basketball, and baseball coach and athletic director at the College of William & Mary
Rube Ursella (1890-1980), American football player-coach who played during the early years of the National Football League
Reuben Charles Warnes (1875-1961), British boxer

Outlaws
Rube Burrow (1854-1890), American Old West train robber and outlaw

See also
Hey Rube (disambiguation) 

Lists of people by nickname
Pejorative terms for people